The men's snowboard halfpipe competition at the 2007 Asian Winter Games in Changchun, China was held on 30 January at the Beida Lake Skiing Resort.

Schedule
All times are China Standard Time (UTC+08:00)

Results
Legend
DNS — Did not start

Qualification run 1

Qualification run 2

Final

References 

Qualification 1
Qualification 2
Final
Final ranking

External links
FIS website

Men